Inky may refer to:

People

People with the given name Inky
 Inky Mark (born 1947), Canadian politician
 Inky Moore (1925–2000), American conservationist

People with the nickname Inky
 Pete Incaviglia (born 1964), American professional baseball player
 Keith Ingram (headmaster) (1929–2007), British head teacher

Arts, entertainment, and media
 Inky (ghost), the cyan ghost in the arcade game Pac-Man
 Inky, a nickname for The Philadelphia Inquirer

Other uses
 Inky (police dog), a police dog who appeared in the British police drama Softly, Softly: Taskforce
 Inky, slang for a printer

See also
Ink
Inki
Inkie